Switzerland competed at the 2012 Summer Paralympics in London, United Kingdom from August 29 to September 9, 2012.

Medallists

Archery 

Men

|-
|align=left|Philippe Horner
|align=left|Ind. Compound Open
|656
|8
| L 4-6
|colspan=5|did not advance
|}

Women

|-
|align=left|Magali Comte
|align=left|Ind. Recurve Standing
|514
|12
|
| W 6-2
| L 4-6
|colspan=3|did not advance
|}

Athletics 

Men's Track and Road Events

Women's Track and Road Events

Cycling

Road

Men

Women

Mixed

Track

Time Trial

Individual Pursuit

Shooting

Swimming 

Women

Table tennis 

Men

Wheelchair Tennis

See also

 Switzerland at the 2012 Summer Olympics

References

Nations at the 2012 Summer Paralympics
2012